Bollullos de la Mitación is a city located in the province of Seville, Spain. According to the 2006 census by the (Instituto Nacional de Estadística), the city has a population of 7084 inhabitants.

References

External links
Bollullos de la Mitación website (in Spanish)

Municipalities of the Province of Seville